Frederick John Teggart (1870–1946) was an Irish-American historian and social scientist, known for work on the history of civilizations.

Life

He was born in Belfast on 9 May 1870, and was educated at Methodist College Belfast and Trinity College, Dublin. He emigrated to the United States and graduated B.A. at Stanford University in 1894. He then worked as a librarian, first at Stanford and then at the Mechanics-Mercantile Library in San Francisco.

He had positions at the University of California, becoming Associate Professor there in 1911; in 1919 a new department was set up for him, at Berkeley, the Department of Social Institutions. A full professor in 1925, he retired in 1940, although he remained actively engaged in research until shortly before his death. He supervised Robert Nisbet's doctorate studies.

Influence on Toynbee
When Arnold J. Toynbee was still forming his concept for A Study of History he read some of Teggart's works. "You are quite right about my debt to Professor Teggart," he wrote U.C. sociology professor Margaret T. Hodgen. "I read [. . .] his books at a time when, though I knew what I wanted to do, I still could not find the right starting point. Dr. Teggart's work, more than anyone else's, opened the door for me."

Works
 Prolegomena to history: the relation of history to literature, philosophy, and science (Berkeley: University of California Press, 1916)
 The Processes of History (New Haven: Yale University Press, 1918)
 Theory of History (New Haven:  Yale University Press, 1925)
 Rome and China: a study of correlations in historical events (1939)

Notes

References
University of California: In Memoriam

Further reading
Grace Dangberg (1983), A guide to the life and works of Frederick J. Teggart

External links
 
http://burawoy.berkeley.edu/PS/Berkeley%20Sociology.pdf
Answers.com page
Bookrags page
Jiffynotes page

1870 births
1946 deaths
American historians
People from Belfast
Alumni of Trinity College Dublin
Stanford University alumni
University of California, Berkeley faculty